St. Anne's Church (Annenkirche in German;  церковь Святой Анны in Russian) is a Lutheran church in Saint Petersburg, Russia. It was built in 1775-1779 by Georg Friedrich Veldten for the German community in a Neoclassical style with Ionic columns.

After the church was closed in 1935 by the Soviet regime, architect Alexander Gegello had it transformed into a cinema (called Spartak). At the beginning of the 21st century a nightclub opened inside the building and it was damaged by a fire. The building was fully restored for its original purpose in 2012-2013 by the Evangelical Lutheran Church of Ingria, its new owner.

Every Sunday morning, there is a worship service in Russian, and during the school year there is a service in English. Several rooms in the building house exhibitions by modern painters.

External links
 
 Annenkirche in English

Lutheran churches in Saint Petersburg
Religious buildings and structures completed in 1779
Cultural heritage monuments of federal significance in Saint Petersburg
Neoclassical church buildings in Russia